Anton Lesser (born 14 February 1952) is an English actor. He is well known for his roles as Qyburn in the HBO series Game of Thrones, Thomas More in Wolf Hall,  Prime Minister Harold Macmillan in The Crown, Prime Minister Clement Attlee in A United Kingdom, Chief Superintendent Bright in Endeavour and Major Partagaz in Star Wars: Andor.

Early life
Born in Birmingham, Anton Lesser attended Moseley Grammar School and the University of Liverpool, where he read architecture. He then went to the Royal Academy of Dramatic Art, and on graduation in 1977 he was awarded the Bancroft Gold Medal as the most promising actor of his year. He is of Jewish background.

Career
As an associate artist with the Royal Shakespeare Company (RSC), Lesser played many of Shakespeare's great roles in the BBC Television Shakespeare productions including Troilus (Troilus and Cressida), Edgar (King Lear), Petruchio, Romeo, Henry Bolingbroke, Brutus (Julius Caesar), Leontes (Winter's Tale) and Richard III.

Lesser is a frequent radio contributor and played the title role in the BBC Radio adaptations of the first five Marcus Didius Falco mysteries by Lindsey Davis. He has also recorded many audiobooks, including much of the work of Charles Dickens. His recording of Great Expectations won him a Talkie Award. Other books range from John Milton's Paradise Lost and Homer to contemporary novels by Robert Harris (Fatherland) and Philip Pullman. For two months in 2013, Lesser was a regular cast member playing Robin Carrow in Ambridge Extra, a BBC Radio 4 Extra spin-off from the BBC Radio 4 drama The Archers.

In 2015, Lesser was announced as a public supporter of Chapel Lane Theatre Company based in Stratford-upon-Avon, UK.

Lesser portrayed Thomas More in the BBC mini-series Wolf Hall, and received a nomination for the British Academy Television Award for Best Supporting Actor for his performance.

Personal life
With his wife Madeleine, he has two children, Harry and Lily Lesser. Lily is an actress, who has acted alongside her father in Endeavour and Wolf Hall.

Filmography

Film

Television

Podcasts

Video Games

Theatre performances
 Romeo and Juliet Romeo, 1980, RSC
 Hamlet Hamlet, 1982, Donmar Warehouse, London
 Troilus and Cressida Troilus, 1981, RSC
 The Plantagenets (Henry VI, part 1–3 and Richard III) Richard III, 1988, RSC
 Two Shakespearean Actors Edwin Forrest, 1990, RSC
 Richard II Henry Bullingbrook, 1990, RSC
 The Taming of the Shrew Petruchio, 1992, RSC
 The Merry Wives of Windsor Frank Ford, 1992, RSC
 'Art' Serge, 1997, Wyndham's Theatre, London
 Private Lives Elyot, 1999, Lyttelton Theatre, London
 Cymbeline Iachimo, 2003, RSC
 Julius Caesar Marcus Brutus, 2005, Barbican, London
 The Winter's Tale Leontes, 2006, RSC
 The Vertical Hour Oliver Lucas, 2008, Royal Court Theatre, London
 A Doll's House Dr. Rank, 2009, Donmar Warehouse, London

Awards and nominations

References

External links

Lesser Anton
Living people
20th-century English male actors
21st-century English male actors
Alumni of RADA
Alumni of the University of Liverpool
English male film actors
English male Shakespearean actors
English male stage actors
English male television actors
English male voice actors
Jewish English male actors
Male actors from Birmingham, West Midlands
People educated at Moseley School
Lesser, Aton